The uninhabited island of Barther Oie belongs to the German federal state of Mecklenburg-Vorpommern and lies in the lagoon of Barther Bodden, between the town of Barth and the Baltic seaside resort of Zingst.
 
Today the island is a nature reserve in the  West Pomeranian Lagoon Area National Park.

Zingst
German islands in the Baltic
Nature reserves in Mecklenburg-Western Pomerania
Islands of Mecklenburg-Western Pomerania
Uninhabited islands of Germany